Addiscombe Recreation Ground, commonly known as Bingham Park, is a park situated in Addiscombe, London. The park is managed by London Borough of Croydon. Addiscombe tram stop is located just next to the recreation ground and is served by Tramlink.

Facilities 

Children's playground
Toilets
Football pitches
Tennis courts
Basketball court
Grass areas and flower beds.
The ground is locked at night.

History 

The park is within a residential area and can only be reached by foot. The area was acquired in 1905 and laid out in 1911. It had previously been farmland but expansion of Croydon in the early 20th-century meant that it was needed for residential purposes. The land was once part of the Ashburton Estate owned by the Baring family.

See also
List of Parks and Open Spaces in Croydon
Addiscombe Linear Park

References

External links
Croydon Council - Information
Croydon Council - History

Parks and open spaces in the London Borough of Croydon